The 2018 Georgia gubernatorial election took place on November 6, 2018, concurrently with other statewide and local elections to elect the next governor of the U.S. state of Georgia.  Republican Secretary of State Brian Kemp won the election, defeating Democratic former State Representative Stacey Abrams.

The primary elections were held on May 22, 2018, and a primary runoff was held on July 24, 2018, between Republican candidates Kemp and Lieutenant Governor Casey Cagle; Kemp prevailed. Incumbent Republican Governor Nathan Deal was term-limited and thus could not seek re-election to a third consecutive term. Abrams won the Democratic primary with over 75% of the vote, allowing her to avoid a runoff. Kemp was the sitting Secretary of State at the time of the election. Kemp's position led to accusations of a conflict of interest, as Kemp oversaw the administration of an election in which he was the candidate.

On November 7, Kemp declared victory over Abrams. The following morning, Kemp resigned as Secretary of State. On November 16, every county certified their votes with Kemp leading by roughly 55,000 votes. Shortly after the election certification, Abrams suspended her campaign; she accepted Kemp as the legal winner of the election while refusing to say that the election was legitimate. Abrams has since claimed numerous instances of election activity that allegedly unfairly affected the results. Following the election, Abrams and her organization Fair Fight filed a number of lawsuits challenging the constitutionality and Voting Rights Act compliance of Georgia's voting laws; some of which continue to wind their way through the courts in 2022.

Kemp prevailed by 54,723 votes, defeating Abrams 50.2–48.8%. The 2018 gubernatorial election was the closest governor's race in Georgia since 1966.

Republican primary

Candidates

Nominated
 Brian Kemp, Secretary of State of Georgia and candidate for Agriculture Commissioner in 2006

Eliminated in the runoff
 Casey Cagle, Lieutenant Governor of Georgia

Eliminated in the primary
 Hunter Hill, former state senator
 Clay Tippins, consulting firm executive and retired Navy SEAL
 Michael Williams, state senator

Withdrew
 Marc Alan Urbach, journalist, former teacher and write-in candidate for President of the United States in 2016

Declined
 Nick Ayers, political strategist and chief of staff to U.S. Vice President Mike Pence
 Burt Jones, state senator
 Josh McKoon, state senator (running for Secretary of State)
 David Perdue, U.S. Senator
 Sonny Perdue, United States Secretary of Agriculture and former governor
 Tom Price, former United States Secretary of Health and Human Services and former U.S. Representative
 David Ralston, Speaker of the Georgia House of Representatives
 Lynn Westmoreland, former U.S. Representative

Endorsements

First round

Polling

Results

Runoff
Casey Cagle and Brian Kemp advanced to a runoff on July 24, 2018, since neither candidate amassed over 50% of the vote in the May 22 primary. On July 18, 2018, President Trump tweeted his support for Kemp, and Vice President Pence traveled to Georgia to campaign with him on July 20, 2018.

Polling

Debates

Results
Brian Kemp easily won the runoff by nearly 40 points despite the latest polls having him up by no more than 18. Cagle won only two counties, Monroe and Stephens.

Democratic primary

Candidates

Nominated
 Stacey Abrams, former state representative and former Minority Leader of the Georgia House of Representatives

Eliminated in the primary
 Stacey Evans, Attorney and former state representative

Declined
 John Barrow, former U.S. Representative (running for Secretary of State)
 Jason Carter, former state senator, nominee for governor in 2014 and grandson of former President Jimmy Carter
 Kasim Reed, former mayor of Atlanta
 Teresa Tomlinson, Mayor of Columbus
 Sally Yates, former U.S. Deputy Attorney General

Endorsements

Polling

Results

Libertarian primary

Candidates

Declared
 Ted Metz, chair of the Libertarian Party of Georgia

Withdrew
 Doug Craig, former chair of the Libertarian Party of Georgia

General election
If no candidate had gained a simple majority of the votes in the general election, a runoff election between the top two candidates would have been held on December 4, 2018.

Debates 

 A second debate was scheduled for November 4, 2018 (2 days before Election Day), but it was canceled when Kemp pulled out of the schedule in order to attend a rally for President Donald Trump. The Kemp campaign sent multiple other dates but the Abrams campaign declined due to a full schedule.

Predictions

Endorsements

Polling

Graphical summary

with Casey Cagle

with Clay Tippins

with Hunter Hill

with Stacey Evans

with Casey Cagle

with Brian Kemp

Results

Results by county
All results from the office of the Secretary of State of Georgia.

Counties that flipped from Democratic to Republican
 Burke (largest municipality: Waynesboro)
 Chattahoochee (largest municipality: Cusseta)
 Quitman (largest municipality: Georgetown)
 Twiggs (largest municipality: Jeffersonville)
 Washington (largest municipality: Sandersville)
 Wilkinson (largest municipality: Gordon)

Counties that flipped from Republican to Democratic
 Cobb (largest municipality: Marietta)
 Gwinnett (largest municipality: Peachtree Corners)

Voter demographics

Electoral controversies
Kemp retained his office as Georgia Secretary of State throughout the campaign, leading to allegations of a conflict of interest for overseeing an election in which he himself was a candidate. During the campaign, he was called upon by former president and former Governor of Georgia Jimmy Carter and the Georgia chapters of the NAACP and Common Cause to resign from the secretariat position. Kemp refused to do so until after he claimed victory, two days following the election. Kemp also accused the state Democratic Party of hacking into the state's voter database a few days before the election; however, an email released shortly after the accusation was made showed the party warning election security experts, highlighting "massive" vulnerabilities within the state's My Voter Page and its online voter registration system, not an attempt to hack the database, as Kemp had claimed.

Irregularities in voter registration occurred prior to the election. Between 2012 and 2018, Kemp's office canceled over 1.4 million voter registrations, with nearly 700,000 cancellations in 2017 alone. Over 300,000 people were removed from the rolls on the grounds that they had moved to a new address when they actually had not.  On a single night in July 2017, half a million voters had their registrations canceled. According to The Atlanta Journal-Constitution, election-law experts said that this "may represent the largest mass disenfranchisement in US history." The registrations of 53,000 voters, disproportionately affecting black people, were delayed by Kemp's office for not exactly matching state driver records. After a lawsuit was filed, Kemp agreed to allow flagged voters to vote if they had identification. These irregularities resulted in allegations that Kemp was using voter suppression to increase his chances of winning the contest. Georgia election officials responded to these allegations by stating that any voter flagged for irregularities could still vote, receiving a regular ballot (not a provisional ballot), by providing ID at a valid polling place, as is required of all voters by state law. Concerning the question of why the pending registration status mattered if those voters could vote normally at the polls, critics claimed that learning of this status might discourage those voters from turning out to the polls at all.

The Washington Post reported that "more than 200 polling places" across Georgia were closed in the 2018 election, "primarily in poor and minority neighborhoods. Voters reported long lines, malfunctioning voting machines and other problems that delayed or thwarted voting in those areas." (The Atlanta Journal-Constitution found that "precinct closures and longer distances likely prevented an estimated 54,000 to 85,000 voters from casting ballots" on the 2018 Election Day.) According to Richard L. Hasen, professor of law and political science at the University of California at Irvine, "there is no question that Georgia in general and Brian Kemp in particular took steps to make it harder for people to register and vote, and that those people tended to skew Democratic."

On November 12, 2018 U.S. District Court Judge Amy Totenberg ruled that Georgia’s secretary of state office must take steps to preserve provisional ballots and begin counting them. On November 13, 2018, U.S. District Court Judge Leigh Martin May ruled that Gwinnett County violated the Civil Rights Act in rejecting absentee ballots with missing or incorrect specified year of birth of the absentee voter.

On November 16, 2018, Abrams announced that she was ending her campaign. Abrams acknowledged that Kemp would be certified as victor, while emphasizing that her statement was not a concession, saying "I acknowledge that Secretary of State Brian Kemp will be certified as the victor of the 2018 gubernatorial election. [...] But let’s be clear, this is not a speech of concession because concession means to acknowledge an action is right, true or proper." Abrams announced the creation of Fair Fight Action, a voting rights nonprofit organization that sued the secretary of state and state election board in federal court for voter suppression. In February 2021, a federal judge ruled that Fair Fight's claims about voting machines, voter list security, and polling place issues were resolved by changes in Georgia's election law, or invalidated due to lack of standing to sue. In April 2021, a judge allowed some claims in the legal challenge to proceed while rejecting others. On September 30, 2022, a federal judge ruled against Fair Fight on the remaining claims, finding that Georgia's voting practices did not violate the Constitution or the Voting Rights Act. According to the judge, the case "resulted in wins and losses for all parties over the course of the litigation and culminated in what is believed to have been the longest voting rights bench trial in the history of the Northern District of Georgia."

Since losing the election, Abrams has repeatedly claimed that the election was not fairly conducted and has declined to call Kemp the legitimate governor of Georgia. Her position is that Kemp, who oversaw the election in his role as Secretary of State, had a conflict of interest and suppressed turnout by purging nearly 670,000 voter registrations in 2017, and that about 53,000 voter registrations were pending a month before the election. She has said, "I have no empirical evidence that I would have achieved a higher number of votes. However, I have sufficient and I think legally sufficient doubt about the process to say that it was not a fair election."

On November 9, 2018, the Atlanta Journal-Constitution reported that its investigation of the 2018 statewide elections in Georgia had found "no evidence ... of systematic malfeasance – or of enough tainted votes to force a runoff election". A follow-up analysis in December 2019 by the Atlanta Journal-Constitution found "an estimated 54,000 to 85,000 voters" were impacted by changes, such as precinct closures in the aftermath of Shelby County v. Holder. However, it found that Abrams would have need up to 67% of the votes at "ideal voting locations" for a runoff to occur.

In his 2020 book, University of California law professor and election law expert Richard L. Hasen described Kemp as "perhaps the most incompetent state chief elections officer" in the 2018 elections and said it was "hard to tell" which of Kemp's "actions were due to incompetence and which were attempted suppression."

According to Washington Post fact checker Glenn Kessler writing in September 2022, Abrams repeatedly falsely claimed that she "won" the election, that the election was "rigged", that it was "stolen", that it was not "free and fair", and that Kemp had "cheated". Kessler said that "Abrams played up claims the election was stolen until such tactics became untenable for anyone who claims to be an advocate for American democratic norms and values".

References

External links
Candidates at Vote Smart
Candidates at Ballotpedia

Official campaign websites
Stacey Abrams (D) for Governor
Brian Kemp (R) for Governor
Ted Metz (L) for Governor

Gubernatorial
2018
Georgia